Juskowiak is a Polish surname. Notable people with the surname include:

Andrzej Juskowiak (born 1970), Polish footballer
Erich Juskowiak (1926–1983), German footballer
Jerzy Juskowiak (1939–1993), Polish sprinter

Polish-language surnames